Josiah Slavin (born December 31, 1998) is an American professional ice hockey forward currently playing for the San Diego Gulls in the American Hockey League (AHL) as a prospect to the Anaheim Ducks of the National Hockey League (NHL). He was selected by the Chicago Blackhawks in the seventh round, 193rd overall, of the 2018 NHL Entry Draft.

Playing career 
Slavin played college hockey for Colorado College in the National Collegiate Hockey Conference and was drafted by the Blackhawks in the seventh round of the 2018 NHL Entry Draft, and signed a two year entry-level contract on March 16, 2021. He is the younger brother of Jaccob Slavin, a defenseman for the Carolina Hurricanes.

During the final year of his entry-level contract in the 2022–23 season, Slavin contributed with just 3 goals in 51 regular season with the Rockford IceHogs before he was traded by the Blackhawks to the Anaheim Ducks in exchange for Hunter Drew on February 23, 2022.

Personal life 

He is the younger brother of Jaccob Slavin, a defenseman for the Carolina Hurricanes. Like his brother, Slavin is a strong Christian. He frequently cites his faith as part of how he approaches games. Before every game he plays, Slavin kneels at center ice and prays.

Career statistics

References

External links

1998 births
Living people
Chicago Blackhawks draft picks
Chicago Blackhawks players
Chicago Steel players
Colorado College Tigers men's ice hockey players
Lincoln Stars players
Rockford IceHogs (AHL) players
San Diego Gulls (AHL) players
Tri-City Storm players